The South Canterbury Rugby Football Union (SCRFU) is a rugby province based in the central South Island city of Timaru, New Zealand. The South Canterbury team play at Fraser Park located in Timaru.

History
Club rugby in South Canterbury predated the formation of South Canterbury RFU by at least two decades. The first recorded club rugby match in South Canterbury was played on 15 October 1867 between The Timaru and Temuka Clubs at Arowhenua. Eight years later, in 1875, the South Canterbury Football Club was formed, founded by Alfred St. George Hamersley the former captain of the England national rugby union team and resident of Timaru. Soon after on 24 May 1875 a match was played between North and South Canterbury at Ashburton that resulted in a draw. More clubs were formed, such as the Waimate Football Club on 24 May 1876, and Christchurch are recorded as playing Temuka in 1876. On 26 July 1879, a meeting was held in Timaru at the instigation again of Hamersley, at which delegates representing the clubs Christchurch, Christ's College, Temuka, North Canterbury (Rangiora), Eastern (Christchurch), South Canterbury (Timaru), Ashburton, and Southbridge agreed to form the Canterbury Rugby Football Union.

The South Canterbury Rugby Football Union (SCRFU) was formed in 1888 when it broke away from the Canterbury Rugby Football Union. A meeting of delegates from football clubs in South Canterbury was held at the office of "Messrs Hamersley and Wood, Timaru, to consider the advisability of forming a Rugby Football Union in the district." Once again, Hamersley was involved in a pivotal point in the history of rugby in the region and his role was commemorated in 2010 with the introduction of the Hamersley trophy, a 186 cm tall silver trophy, for the winners of the senior rugby competition (the Personnel Placements club rugby championship). This meeting was attended by delegates from the South Canterbury, Pirates, Temuka, Waimate, Geraldine, Winchester and Fairlie Creek clubs and as a result of the union the South Canterbury club agreed to change its name to the Timaru Club. Formal association with the Canterbury RFU was broken and it was established that the boundaries of the South Canterbury union were to be the Rangitata and Waitaki rivers, and the headquarters was Timaru. Soon after, a representative match was played on 24 July 1888 against the New Zealand Native Team on the Athletic Grounds, Timaru.

South Canterbury has produced a number of All Blacks and are one of the few unions to have played in all three Divisions of the NPC. South Canterbury has also had some notable victories over touring international sides including the 1961 French team. In 2011 the South Canterbury Heartland team played the 2011 Russian World Cup team who toured New Zealand before the 2011 Rugby World Cup at Fraser Park. Also 2011 saw two sell out Super 15 games played at Fraser Park in Timaru - the Crusaders vs the Bulls and Crusaders vs The Blues.

Representative Rugby

The South Canterbury Rugby team play from Fraser Park, Timaru and they play their rugby in the Heartland Championship. They also compete against Mid Canterbury and North Otago for the Hanan Shield.

South Canterbury in Super Rugby

South Canterbury along with Canterbury, Tasman, Buller, Mid Canterbury and West Coast make up the Crusaders Super Rugby franchise.

Championships

South Canterbury won the 2nd division South Island in 1976, 1977, 1981 and the 3rd division in 1986, 1991, 1998, and in 2001. And the Lochore Cup in 2013.

Heartland Championship placings

Sevens

South Canterbury hosted the 2010 and 2011 South Island Sevens Tournament at Fraser Park in Timaru, A Provincial qualifier to the New Zealand National Rugby Sevens Tournament in Queenstown
South Canterbury has qualified and competed at a number of New Zealand National Rugby Sevens Tournament the last been in 2011.

Ranfurly Shield
South Canterbury has held the Ranfurly Shield twice, in 1950 and 1974.

1950
Matches played:

Sth Canterbury 17 vs Wairarapa 14, Masterton, 
North Auckland 20 vs Sth Canterbury 9, Timaru,

Team members:
Coach: Brushy Mitchell (centre, second row)
Captain: Morrie Goddard (third from left)
Vice Captain: Lachie Grant (third from right)

1974

Matches played:
Sth Canterbury 18 vs Marlborough 6, Blenheim on 17 August
Sth Canterbury 9 vs North Otago 3, Timaru on 31 August
Wellington 9 vs Sth Canterbury 3, Timaru on 3 September

Team members:
Captain: Ken Milne

Hanan Shield
The Hanan Shield is one of the most prestigious trophies in New Zealand's domestic rugby union competition. First played for in 1946, the Hanan Shield is based on a challenge system played between North Otago, South Canterbury and Mid Canterbury. South Canterbury are the current holders of the Shield after beating Mid Canterbury 17–15 on 13 October 2012.

International Victories 
Victories by South Canterbury versus International Tourists; France 1961, California 1972, Romania 1975, Japan 1979, Tonga 1983.

Club Rugby

Current Clubs 
South Canterbury Rugby Football Union is made up of nine clubs: 
 Timaru Celtic RFC
 Geraldine RFC 
 Harlequins RFC (Amalgamation of Zingari and Star in 1998)
 Mackenzie RFC
 Old Boys RFC
 Pareora RFC
 Pleasant Point RFC
 Temuka RFC
 Waimate RFC

Club Championship Winners

Total Championships By Club

High School Rugby 
 Timaru Boys' High School and Roncalli College 1st XV play in the Crusaders Region Secondary Schools' Rugby Championship "The Press Cup"

Notable players

All Blacks
There have been 22 players selected for the All Blacks whilst playing their club rugby in South Canterbury.

Name, All Black No. & Year: 
 John H. Gardner, No.25, 1893
 Charles N. MacIntosh, No.39, 1893
 David Stewart, No.54, 1894
 Alfred Budd, No.160, 1910
 Thomas W. Lynch, No.177, 1913
 Augustine P. Spillane, No.200, 1913
 Eric Cockroft, No.203, 1913
 Percival W. Storey, No.224, 1920
 Ronald T. Stewart, No.288, 1923
 Gordon P. Lawson, No.320, 1925
 Archie Strang, No.342, 1928
 Thomas C. Metcalfe, No.384, 1931
 George T. A. Adkins, No.409, 1935
 Tom Morrison, No.441, 1938
 Charles Saxton, No.443, 1938
 Maurice P. Goddard, No.467, 1946
 Lachlan A. Grant, No.471, 1947
 John W. Goddard, No.499, 1949
 Thomas Coughlan, No.592, 1958
 Allan J. Stewart, No.638, 1963
 Tom N. Lister, No.673, 1968
 Lyn Jaffray, No.711, 1972

To view player profile, go to allblacks.com

Super 12/14
Brendan Laney Otago Highlanders
Graham Dempster Canterbury Crusaders

References

External links
 NZrugbynet Official Website
SCRFU.co.nz

New Zealand rugby union teams
New Zealand rugby union governing bodies
Sport in Canterbury, New Zealand
Sports organizations established in 1888
1888 establishments in New Zealand